Syritta aenigmatopatria is a species of syrphid fly in the family Syrphidae.

Distribution
Hawaii, Micronesia, Philippines.

References

Eristalinae
Diptera of Asia
Insects described in 1964